Toure' Ahmad Khalid-Murry (born November 8, 1989) is an American former professional basketball player. He played college basketball for Wichita State.

College career
Murry played college basketball at Wichita State University, leading the Shockers to the second round of the 2012 NCAA Men's Division I Basketball Tournament and winning the 2011 National Invitation Tournament. Murry averaged 12.1 points, 4.8 rebounds and 3.3 assists per game during his senior season in 2011–12.

Professional career

2012–13 season

After going undrafted in the 2012 NBA draft, Murry joined the Los Angeles Lakers for the 2012 NBA Summer League. He spent August and September in Turkey and Israel before returning to the United States. On November 2, 2012, he was selected with the 15th overall pick by the Austin Toros in the 2012 NBA Development League Draft. Three days later, he was traded to the Rio Grande Valley Vipers. During his rookie season, he played 52 games in total for the Vipers, averaging 9.0 points, 2.8 rebounds, 3.0 assists and 1.8 steals per game.

2013–14 season
In July 2013, Murry joined the Houston Rockets for the Orlando Summer League and the New York Knicks for the Las Vegas Summer League. On September 11, 2013, he signed with the Knicks. On January 29, 2014, he was assigned to the Erie BayHawks. He was recalled the next day. On January 31, 2014, he was reassigned to the BayHawks. He was recalled the next day. In 51 games for the Knicks in 2013–14, he averaged 2.7 points and 1.0 assists per game.

2014–15 season
On August 28, 2014, Murry signed with the Utah Jazz. On November 13, 2014, he was assigned to the Idaho Stampede. He was recalled by the Jazz on December 2, reassigned on December 31, and recalled again on January 3. He went on to make his Jazz debut later that night. The next day, he was waived by the Jazz and on January 10, he was reacquired by the Rio Grande Valley Vipers. On February 7, 2015, Murry recorded his first career triple-double after posting 10 points, 11 rebounds and 11 assists in a 109–107 win over the Texas Legends.

On March 12, 2015, Murry signed a 10-day contract with the Washington Wizards. He signed a second 10-day contract with the Wizards on March 22 but was released halfway through his contract on March 27, and returned to the Vipers three days later. He was subsequently deactivated by the Vipers and did not play for the team again in 2014–15.

2015–16 season
In July 2015, Murry joined the Washington Wizards for the 2015 NBA Summer League, but was limited to just two total minutes of action due to a right groin injury. He later re-signed with the Wizards on September 25, 2015, only to be waived again by the team on October 24 after appearing in four preseason games.

On October 31, 2015, Murry was acquired by the Texas Legends in a trade with the Vipers. On November 13, he made his debut for the Legends in a 104–82 loss to the Austin Spurs, recording 10 points, five rebounds and seven assists in 39 minutes.

On March 4, 2016, Murry was traded to the Sioux Falls Skyforce in exchange for the returning player rights to Andre Dawkins. On March 11, he made his debut for the Skyforce in a 121–117 win over the Canton Charge, recording 12 points, three rebounds, four assists and one block in 24 minutes off the bench. He helped the Skyforce finish with a D-League-best 40–10 record in 2015–16, and went on to help the team win the league championship with a 2–1 Finals series win over the Los Angeles D-Fenders, his second D-League title.

2016–17 season
In July 2016, Murry joined the Minnesota Timberwolves for the 2016 NBA Summer League. On September 26, 2016, he signed with the Timberwolves, but was waived on October 22 after appearing in three preseason games. On December 5, he signed with Yeşilgiresun Belediye of the Turkish Super League. On February 3, 2017, he parted ways with Yeşilgiresun.

2017–18 season
On July 24, 2017, Murry signed with German club ratiopharm Ulm for the 2017–18 season. On January 10, 2018, he left Ulm and signed with Greek club Promitheas Patras.

2019–20 season
On July 18, 2019, Murry joined Portuguese club Benfica of the Portuguese Basketball League. He averaged 10.6 points, 2.1 rebounds, and 2.8 assists per game. Murry left the team in January 2020.

2020–21 season
On September 6, 2020, Murry signed with BC Luleå of the Basketligan.

2021–22 season
Murry began the 2021-22 season with Al Qadsia of the Kuwaiti Division I Basketball League. On January 5, 2022, Murry signed with BC Ternopil of the Ukrainian Basketball SuperLeague. He then joined the Astros de Jalisco in Mexico, winning a CIBACOPA league title, before announcing his retirement in September 2022.

Career statistics

College

|-
| align="left"| 2008–09
| align="left"| Wichita State
| 34 || 34 || 28.2 || .371 || .321 || .753 || 3.8 || 2.5 || 1.3 || .4 || 11.0
|-
| align="left"| 2009–10
| align="left"| Wichita State
| 35 || 35 || 31.6 || .424 || .331 || .708 || 5.0 || 3.1 || 1.4 || .3 || 11.9
|-
| align="left"| 2010–11
| align="left"| Wichita State
| 37 || 33 || 26.1 || .407 || .283 || .797 || 4.5 || 3.4 || 1.2 || .3 || 9.4
|-
| align="left"| 2011–12
| align="left"| Wichita State
| 32 || 27 || 29.3 || .420 || .286 || .786 || 4.8 || 3.3 || 1.2 || .3 || 12.1
|-class="sortbottom"
| align="center" colspan="2"| Career
| 138 || 127 || 28.8 || .404 || .311 || .761 || 4.5 || 3.1 || 1.3 || .3 || 11.1

NBA

Regular season

|-
| align="left"| 
| align="left"| New York
| 51 || 0 || 7.3 || .434 || .417 || .590 || .9 || 1.0 || .4 || .0 || 2.7
|-
| align="left"| 
| align="left"| Utah
| 1 || 0 || 1.0 || .000 || .000 || .000 || .0 || .0 || .0 || .0 || .0
|-
| align="left"| 
| align="left"| Washington
| 4 || 0 || 4.3 || .500 || .000 || 1.000 || .3 || .3 || .3 || .0 || 1.5
|-class="sortbottom"
| align="center" colspan="2"| Career
| 56 || 0 || 7.0 || .433 || .417 || .610 || .8 || .9 || .4 || .0 || 2.6

References

External links

NBA D-League profile
Eurobasket.com profile
Wichita State Shockers bio

1989 births
Living people
American expatriate basketball people in Bosnia and Herzegovina
American expatriate basketball people in Germany
American expatriate basketball people in Greece
American expatriate basketball people in Italy
American expatriate basketball people in Kuwait
American expatriate basketball people in Mexico
American expatriate basketball people in Portugal
American expatriate basketball people in Sweden
American expatriate basketball people in Turkey
American men's basketball players
Astros de Jalisco players
Basketball players from Houston
Erie BayHawks (2008–2017) players
Idaho Stampede players
New York Knicks players
Point guards
Promitheas Patras B.C. players
Ratiopharm Ulm players
Rio Grande Valley Vipers players
Shooting guards
Sioux Falls Skyforce players
S.L. Benfica basketball players
Texas Legends players
Undrafted National Basketball Association players
Utah Jazz players
Washington Wizards players
Wichita State Shockers men's basketball players
Yeşilgiresun Belediye players